Gaius of Ephesus (also Gaios) is numbered among the Seventy Disciples. He was Bishop of Ephesus (Romans 16:23). The Catholic Church remembers St. Gaius on January 4 among the Seventy, and on November 5.

Possible reference in scripture 
It has been suggested that this is the Gaius to whom the general epistle 3 John was addressed.

Sources 
St. Nikolai Velimirovic, The Prologue from Ohrid

External links
Apostle Gaius of the Seventy, January 4 (OCA)
Apostle Gaius of the Seventy, November 5 (OCA)

References

Seventy disciples
Christian saints from the New Testament
1st-century bishops in Roman Anatolia
Saints from Roman Anatolia
Bishops of Ephesus